Graphite Capital is a private equity firm focused on mid-market leveraged buyout investments, primarily in the UK.  The group manages around £1.2 billion for institutional investors, with the most recent fund raising over £500 million in 2018. Since 1991, the firm has backed almost 100 management teams through various investments.

Until February 2016, the firm managed a listed investment trust, Graphite Enterprise Trust, a diversified private equity fund of funds platform. The management contract was transferred to Intermediate Capital Group.

The firm has managed private equity funds since 1981 and in 2001 became fully independent. The firm has a single office in Air Street in London's West End.  The firm's Chairman is Rod Richards, who joined in 1986, and its Managing Partners are Andy Gray and Markus Golser, who joined in 1992 and 1997 respectively.

History
Foreign & Colonial Enterprise Trust, a UK listed vehicle, was the first fund to be managed by Graphite Capital.  It was established in 1981 with a £10 million initial public offering on the London Stock Exchange. The firm has raised and managed nine listed and unlisted funds to date.

Graphite was originally part of F&C Asset Management and was known as Foreign & Colonial Ventures Ltd. The firm remained a subsidiary of F&C Asset Management until 2001, when the Graphite team completed a management buyout.

Investments

The firm’s ninth and most recent fund made its first investment in NRS Healthcare, a provider of mobility and disability aids and services.

The firm's eighth fund has backed the following companies including:

- City & County Healthcare - a provider of home care services in the UK

- ICR Group - a provider of repair and maintenance services to the energy sector

- nGAGE Specialist Recruitment (formerly Human Capital Investment Group) - a recruitment business serving a range of niche areas within the public and private sectors

- Trenchard Aviation - a civil aircraft maintenance business focusing on cabin services

- New World Trading Company - a pub restaurant group

- Beck & Pollitzer - an industrial machinery installation and relocation specialist

- Random42 – a producer of digital medical animation

- YSC Consulting - a provider of leadership consulting and management assessment

Graphite's seventh fund, which was raised in 2007 and invested until 2013, backed companies including:

- Kurt Geiger - the luxury shoe retailer and wholesaler

- Education Personnel - a provider of supply teachers and teaching assistants to state schools in the UK

- Alexander Mann Solutions - a provider of recruitment process outsourcing

- National Fostering Agency - an independent children's fostering agency

- London Square - a house builder focused on prime sites within the M25

- Willowbrook Healthcare - a developer and operator or premium elderly care homes

Graphite's current portfolio also includes:

- U-POL - a manufacturer and distributor of fillers, coatings and aerosols

- Explore Learning - a provider of after school tuition for children aged between 5 and 14

- Hawksmoor - the operator of premium steak restaurants

Earlier investments include Corbin & King - the operator of signature restaurants in London, the Groucho Club which was sold in July 2015,  
Dominion Oil & Gas, NES Group, Wagamama and Park Holidays.

References

External links
Graphite Capital (company website)

Private equity firms of the United Kingdom
Financial services companies based in London
Financial services companies established in 1981